Anudeep Devarakonda is an Indian playback singer, score composer. He is known as Anudeep Dev in the field of music. With Ahana Pellanta he made his début and did playback singing in about 70 feature films and has sung 100 songs. Some of the feature films with his songs are Uyyala Jampala and Pilla Nuvvu Leni Jeevitham.

Career
Anudeep was born in Kurnool, Andhra Pradesh on 9 May 1989. He completed his bachelor's degree in Hyderabad. He has performed on television shows such as ETV's SYE singers Challenge, Padalani undi (MAA TV), Tara Rum Pum (Gemini TV), and Amul Sangeetha Maha Yudham (Gemini TV). He is associated with his college rock band called ‘Anudeep and the band’. He has worked for music directors including Thaman, Ghibran, Anoop Rubens, MM Keeravani, Jeevan Babu, Shekar Chandra, Radhan and Micky J Meyer.

Discography

As composer

As playback singer

Film songs

Non-film songs 
Cover songs

Singles

Awards
He received 2014 GAMA Award for Best Upcoming Singer - Male

References

External links

1989 births
Indian male playback singers
Singers from Andhra Pradesh
Living people
Film musicians from Andhra Pradesh
People from Kurnool
People from Kurnool district
Telugu playback singers
Indian male artists
Indian male singers